McKee is an unincorporated community in Marion County, Oregon, United States. Its post office was established on March 12, 1888, and David McKee was the first postmaster. It closed in June 1924.

References

Unincorporated communities in Marion County, Oregon
1888 establishments in Oregon
Populated places established in 1888
Unincorporated communities in Oregon
Old Believer communities in the United States